is an interchange passenger railway station located in the city of Kumagaya, Saitama, Japan, operated jointly by East Japan Railway Company (JR East) and the private railway operator Chichibu Railway.

Lines
It is located 64.7 kilometers from Tokyo. It is located 14.9 km from Hanyū on the Chichibu Main Line.

Station layout

JR East

The JR East station consists of two ground-level island platforms, serving four tracks for the Takasaki Line,  with an elevated station building above the platforms.  Shinkansen services are provided by one side platform and one island platform serving three tracks, located above the station building. The station has a “Midori no Madoguchi” staffed ticket office.

Chichibu Railway
The Chichibu Railway Station consists of one island platform serving two tracks, with an elevated station building located above the platform.

Platforms

History
The station on the Takasaki Line opened on July 28, 1883. The Chichibu Line platforms opened on October 7, 1901. The Jōetsu Shinkansen platforms opened on November 15, 1982. The station became part of the JR East network after the privatization of the JNR on 1 April 1987.

Passenger statistics
In fiscal 2019, the JR East portion of Kumagaya Station was used by an average of 30,064 passengers daily (boarding passengers only). In fiscal 2018, the Chichibu Railway portion of the station was used by an average of 10,927 passengers daily.

Surrounding area
 Kumagaya City Office
 Kumagaya General Hospital

See also
 List of railway stations in Japan

References

External links

JR East station information 
Chichibu Railway station timetable 

Railway stations in Saitama Prefecture
Railway stations in Japan opened in 1883
Stations of East Japan Railway Company
Railway stations in Kumagaya
Takasaki Line
Shōnan-Shinjuku Line